Pasquale Foti (3 February 1950) is an entrepreneur, and president of Reggina Calcio.

Reggina Calcio 
In 1986 Foti became managing director of the newly re-formed and renamed Reggina Calcio. In 1991, he became president. Under his presidency, Reggina won their first promotion into Italy's top football club league Serie A. Pasquale Foti was fined £20,000 (equivalent) and banned from football for 2½ years for his involvement in the 2005-06 match fixing scandal.

References

1950 births
Living people
Reggina 1914
People from Reggio Calabria
Italian football chairmen and investors